Several units of the Royal Canadian Navy have been named HMCS Royal Mount.

 , a  renamed Buckingham before commissioning. The ship served in the Battle of the Atlantic during the Second World War.
 , a River-class frigate, ordered as Alvington and renamed before commissioning. The ship served in the Battle of the Atlantic during the Second World War.

Battle honours
Atlantic, 1944-45.

References

 Government of Canada Ships' Histories - HMCS Royalmount

Royal Canadian Navy ship names